Natalie Fleur Cook is an Australian politician and anti-violence campaigner. She became an anti-violence campaigner after the death of her son in a one-punch attack in 2008.

Cook is a Labor member of the South Australian House of Assembly, representing Hurtle Vale since the 2018 state election. She previously represented Fisher after winning the 2014 by-election, vacated by the death of independent member Bob Such. Cook was elected with a majority of 0.02%, a victory margin of nine votes. She represented the seat until it was abolished in the 2018 election.

Cook has served as the Minister for Human Services in the Malinauskas ministry since March 2022. Cook was previously the Parliamentary Secretary for Housing and Urban Development from September 2017 until Labor's loss at the 2018 election, after which she was the Shadow Minister for Human Services in the Labor Opposition.

Anti-violence activism 
In 2008 Cook's 17-year-old son Sam Davis was killed in a one-punch attack at a party. Soon after Cook and her partner, Neil Davis, founded the Sammy D Foundation, which runs school programs to spread an anti-violence message and provide positive role models to disadvantaged youth.  Cook stood down from the board of the Sammy D Foundation after she was elected to Parliament.

Political career 
On 20 October 2014 Cook was pre-selected as the Labor Party candidate for the seat of Fisher in the 2014 Fisher by-election, following the death of incumbent member Bob Such.  Cook won the by-election by nine votes from a 7.3 percent two-party swing, resulting in the Weatherill Labor Government changing from minority to majority government.  On a 0.02 percent margin it was the most marginal seat in parliament.

A redistribution of electoral boundaries occurs following each South Australian general election and it was decided in 2016 that the electoral division of Fisher would be abolished.  Its electors were divided between the seats of Davenport, Heysen, Hurtle Vale, and Waite, with Hurtle Vale designated as Fisher's successor by the South Australian Electoral Districts Boundaries Commission.  Cook successfully contested the 2018 general election (when the new boundaries came into effect) in Hurtle Vale, becoming its first representative. Despite Labor losing government, Cook received a swing towards her of 3.6% in two-party preferred terms, taking 55.3% of the two-party preferred vote.

In 2021, one of Cook's staff was arrested and charged with producing and possessing child exploitation material.

Following Labor's victory at the 2022 election, Cook was appointed as Minister for Human Services in the Malinauskas ministry.

References

External links

Parliamentary Profile: SA Labor website
Sammy D Foundation

Year of birth missing (living people)
Living people
Members of the South Australian House of Assembly
Australian Labor Party members of the Parliament of South Australia
Labor Left politicians
21st-century Australian politicians
21st-century Australian women politicians
Women members of the South Australian House of Assembly